This is a list of songs that reached number one on the Billboard magazine Streaming Songs chart in 2015.

Chart history

See also
2015 in music
List of Billboard Hot 100 number-one singles of 2015
List of number-one On-Demand Songs of 2015

References

United States Streaming Songs
Streaming 2015